Aboagye Brenya  ( – September 30, 2021), also known as King or Nana was an actor from Ghana. He has appeared in over 100 Ghanaian and Nigerian movies including Kumasi Yonkoo, Asem, Odasanii. He has been in movies with Agya Koo, Lil Win, Kwaku Manu, Mercy Aseidu, Bob Santo and Abusuapanin Judas to name a few.

Career 
Aboagye was an actor in both Ghanaian and Nigerian movies. He also worked at the Kumasi Cultural Center. He owned a school called Kumasiman Preparatory School and Ohenenana Guest House in Bohyen.

Personal life 
He was married with nine children.

Filmography 
 Abro
 Kae Dabi
 Otan Hunu Kwah
 The Choice
 Remember Your Mother
 That Day
 Sika
 Okukuseku
 Kumasi Yonkoo
 Asem
 Adwen B
 Nyame Bekyere 
 Odasanii
 Nipa Ye Bad
 District Colonial Court

Death and burial 
He died on 30 September 2021 at County Hospital at Abrepo, a suburb of Kumasi in the Ashanti region. He was 82 years old. In March 2022, he was buried in Abira near Bonwire in the Ashanti Region.

References 

1930s births
2021 deaths
Ghanaian male film actors
20th-century Ghanaian male actors
21st-century Ghanaian male actors